Ioan Robu (born November 6, 1944) is a Romanian prelate of the Roman Catholic Church. He was Archbishop of Bucharest from 1990 to 2019.

Biography
Robu was born in Târgu Secuiesc, where his father, a native of Traian, Neamț County, had briefly come to work. A graduate of the Roman Catholic Theological Institute of Iași, he was ordained to the priesthood on 15 August 1968. He then served at the Roman Catholic parish in Craiova and at Saint Joseph's Cathedral in Bucharest. He studied at the Pontifical Lateran University's Alphonsian Academy from 1973 to 1977, earning a Doctor of Sacred Theology degree. During the summer of 1977, he was a parish priest in Buzău, and from 1977 to 1983 he was director of his alma mater in Iaşi.

On 25 October 1984 Pope John Paul II named him apostolic administrator of the Archdiocese of Bucarest and titular bishop of Cellae in Proconsulari. He received his episcopal consecration  on 8 December in Rome from Cardinal Agostino Casaroli. On 14 March 1990 he was appointed Archbishop of Bucarest.

Pope Francis accepted his resignation on 21 November 2019.

References

External links

1944 births
Living people
People from Târgu Secuiesc
Romanian Roman Catholic archbishops
20th-century Romanian people
21st-century Romanian people
Honorary members of the Romanian Academy